The law of Andorra includes customary law and legislation.

Constitution
The Constitution of Andorra was the subject of a referendum on 14 March 1993.

Legislation
The legislature is the Consell General (English: General Council). The gazette is called Butlletí Oficial del Principat d'Andorra (English: Official Bulletin of the Principality of Andorra). Legislation includes decrees.

List of legislation

Decree concerning Andorran nationality of 17 June 1939
Decree of 23 August 1947
Decree concerning Andorran nationality of 7 April 1970
Decree concerning the political rights of Andorran women of 14 April 1970
Decree on legal and political majority of 2 July 1971
Decree concerning the eligibility of Andorran women of 5 September 1973
Decree on the process of institutional reform of 15 January 1981
Decree on arms of 3 July 1989
Penal Code of 11 July 1990
Penal Code of 21 February 2005

Customary law
Historical or material sources of customary law include canon law, Castilian law, Catalan law, French law and Roman law. Literary sources of customary law include the books Manual Digest (1748) and the Politar Andorrà
(1763).

Courts and judiciary
Courts include the Consell Superior de la Justica, the Tribunal Constitucional, the Tribunal Superior de la Justicia, the Tribunal de Corts, the Tribunal de Batlles, and multiple Batllia.

Legal practitioners
Andorra has advocates (French: avocat) and notaries. There is a College of Advocates (French: Collège des Avocats).

Criminal law
The Tribunal de Cortes is the court which has jurisdiction over crime. The Penal Code of 11 July 1990 was the country's first. There is now a new Penal Code of 21 February 2005 Capital punishment was proscribed in 1990. There is a Police Corps of Andorra.

Nationality

Legislation on this subject has included the Decree concerning Andorran nationality of 17 June 1939 and the Decree concerning Andorran nationality of 7 April 1970.

Heritage
Law 9 of 12 July 2003 relates to Patrimoni Cultural and Bé d'interès cultural.

References
A H Angelo, "Andora: Introduction to a Customary Legal System" (1970) 14 American Journal of Legal History 95 JSTOR OUP
Brutails. La Coutume d'Andorre. Ernest Leroux. 1904. (Monumenta Andorrana, volume 1). Google Books:  . Second Edition. Ed Casal i Val. Andorra. 1965. Google Books. See also "La coutume d'Andorre" (1968) 46 (Parts 3 & 4) Revue belge de philologie et d'histoire 1114 & 1115 Google Books.
Pierre Barber. La coutume privee d'Andorre envisagee dans ses sources et dans ses institutions les plus originales. Arthur Rousseau. Paris. 1938. 
August Teulière. La Constitution de l'Andorre: Les Pouvoirs Législatif et Exécutif. Foix: Gadrat aîné. 1904. Internet Archive.
Bertrand Bélinguier. La Condition Juridique des Vallées d'Andorre. Éditions A. Pedone. Paris. 1970. Google Books
Jurisprudence civile d'Andorre: arrets du Tribunal superieur de Perpignan, 1947- 1970.
Principality of Andorra. Recull de Textos Legislatius i Constitucionals d'Andorra. Andorra. 1977.
Rudolf Bernhardt. Encyclopedia of Public International Law. 1990. Pages 8 to 10. 
Kenneth Robert Redden and William Emerson Brock. "The Legal System of the Principality of Andorra". Modern Legal Systems Cyclopedia. W S Hein. 1984. Volume 4. Chapter 2. Paragraph 4.20 et seq. 
Modern Legal Systems Cyclopedia. Volume 4. Chapter 2. Paragraph 4.10 et seq.
World Jurist Association. Law and Judicial Systems of Nations. 2002. Page 6 et seq. Google Books
J  Anglada Vilardebo. "Andorra". International Encyclopedia of Comparative Law. 1970. Volume 1. "National reports". Section A.
Gall and Hobby. Worldmark Encyclopedia of Nations. Twelfth Edition. Thomson Gale. 2007. Volume 5. Page 22. Google Books. 1988. Page 10. Google Books
European Commission of Human Rights. Decisions and Reports 64. Strasbourg. March 1990. Council of Europe p 115
Barry Taylor. Andorra. Clio Press. 1993. Page 44. Google Books

Specific

Law of Andorra